Dear You is the fourth studio album by American punk rock band Jawbreaker, released on September 12, 1995 through DGC Records. Spurred on by releases from Green Day and the Offspring, punk rock reached mainstream status; while promoting their third studio album 24 Hour Revenge Therapy (1994), Jawbreaker were approached by Geffen Records. After securing management, they signed to the label and started recording what would be their major label debut at Fantasy Studios in Berkeley, California with producer Rob Cavallo. While bassist Chris Bauermeister and drummer Adam Pfahler recorded their respective parts within a few days, frontman Blake Schwarzenbach did his parts over six weeks in February and March 1995.

Mainly described as an emo, pop-punk and punk rock album, Dear You returns to the darker sound of Jawbreaker's second album Bivouac (1992). The lyrics largely revolve around the aftermath of the relationship that had informed 24 Hour Revenge Therapy; others, such as "Save Your Generation" and "Chemistry", deal with slacker culture and attending school, respectively. Unlike previous releases, Dear You sees Schwarzenbach sing more instead of scream, with his vocals evoking Morrissey, while the band overall were compared to the work of Green Day, Jawbox and Nirvana.

Dear You was met with generally favorable reviews from music critics, many of whom praised the album's sound and highlighted the lyrics. It peaked at number 22 on the Billboard Heatseekers Albums chart in the United States, where it would sell 40,000 copies by 2002. "Fireman" was released as the album's lead single in August 1995; Jawbreaker embarked on the Monsters of Jaw tour with Jawbox, and then toured Australia as part of the Summersault festival. "Accident Prone" was released as the next single by April 1996, which was promoted with a supporting slot for the Foo Fighters. Following a fist fight between Bauermeister and Schwarzenbach, Jawbreaker announced their break up in 1996.

Jawbreaker's fanbase was not receptive to Dear You at its release, criticizing its production; the decision to sign to with a major label would overtake the album's content, becoming the narrative that the press rallied around. Following the band's demise, fan perception change to a positive one as the album would became an influence on the next wave of emo and pop-punk acts. Many of Dear You songs would feature on tribute albums in the ensuring years while several publications included it on best-of emo album lists. After going out of print, Pfahler's label Blackball Records would reissue it in 2004. Jawbreaker would eventually embark on a celebratory tour of the album in 2022.

Background
Jawbreaker released their third studio album 24 Hour Revenge Therapy in February 1994 through Tupelo Recording Company and The Communion Label. It was quickly overshadowed by the popularity of Dookie (1994) by Green Day and Smash (1994) by the Offspring, both of which pushed pop-punk and punk rock into the mainstream. In turn, major labels wanted to replicate the success of these two releases with bands of their own, taking acts from the underground. A month before the album's release, vocalist and guitarist Blake Schwarzenbach taped demos of songs that would appear on the band's fifth album, including one of "Jet Black". Jawbreaker began playing 500-capacity venues as a result, on their seven-week tour of the United States in March. During this trek, they debuted five new songs, such as "Accident Prone" and "Basilica", two ballads in the vein of their second album Bivouac (1992), and "Shirt" and "Sister", two 24 Hour Revenge Therapy-styled romantic songs.

They received backlash from readers of the punk zine Maximum Rocknroll and people in the East Bay region of San Francisco, California. The band were already being criticized for touring with Nirvana sometime prior, as well as for dropping their earlier material from their live shows and Schwarzenbach's voice changing as a result of throat surgery. While this was occurring, Tupelo and Communion struggled to tackle demand from fans and press. Jawbreaker went on a short, ten-day tour on the US West Coast with Jawbox in July 1994; the members of the former asked the latter about their experiences with major label Atlantic Records. Shortly after this, they recorded a demo of "I Love You So Much It's Killing Us Both". Jawbreaker were then approached by Geffen Records; around this time, they became aware that other labels were interested in them.

Major label and recording

In September 1994, they held meetings with four labels: Capitol Records, Geffen, Warner Bros. Records and another that bassist Chris Bauermeister could not recall. In his 33 1/3 book 24 Hour Revenge Therapy (2018) on the band, Ronen Givony gave an alternate list, with A&R some representatives: American Recordings, Gary Gersh at Capitol, Geffen, MCA Records and Lenny Waronker at Warner Bros. Schwarzenbach's housemate Bill Schneider said the band were continually ignoring advances; it reached a point where people were frequently knocking on the door. In November 1994, they joined Cahn-Man Management, run by Elliot Cahn and Jeff Saltzman, and who worked with Green Day and the Offspring. They felt they had reached a peak on the type of album they could make with the small budgets they were given, and wanted to see what they could do on a bigger label.

Jawbreaker ultimately went with Geffen based on what Bauermeister called a "gut feeling type of thing", alongside their interactions with people at the label and him owning albums by acts on their roster. The band were adamant about retaining control and had to go through a lot of negotiations before their contract was settled. In hindsight, Pfahler thought the label misinterpreted that their cult fanbase as something that could translate into mainstream success. On February 17, 1995, they were signed by Mark Case, who had worked with the likes of Beck, Nirvana and Sonic Youth, to a three-album deal with a $1 million advance. Jawbreaker were given full creative and production control, and were allowed to do side projects on independent labels should they wish to. They used the advance to update their rehearsal space, purchase a new touring van and pay off the balance for their equipment. The remainder was used as the members' monthly salary for the next 12 months.

Jawbreaker recorded their next album at Fantasy Studios in Berkeley, California with Rob Cavallo, whose career had taken off following his work on Dookie. Like their previous releases, Bauermeister and Pfahler recorded their respective parts in three days. Schwarzenbach, meanwhile, spent six weeks working on the album in February and March 1995. He did 12-hour days on guitar tracks and vocal takes with Cavallo; Givony compared this working methodology to Billy Corgan on the Smashing Pumpkins' Siamese Dream (1993) and Kevin Shields on My Bloody Valentine's Loveless (1991). Schwarzenbach recorded a lot of harmony vocal tracks for all of the songs, many of which Bauermeister and Pfahler felt were unnecessary. "Boxcar", a track from 24 Hour Revenge Therapy, was re-recorded during the sessions as the suggestion of Cavallo and Geffen's A&R representative Mark Kates. When mixing engineer Jerry Finn heard it, he remarked that the original version was superior. Alternative Press at the time reported that the album cost over $75,000 to make, while Givony wrote that it was $200,000. Alternative Press contrasted the two months for this with the $3,000 budget and three days it took them to create 24 Hour Revenge Therapy.

Composition and lyrics

Overview
Musically, Dear You has been mainly described as emo, pop-punk, and punk rock. It has also been tagged as alternative rock, indie rock, and grunge, though Chris Norris of Spin discounted the latter, including it on a list of albums that were marketed as grunge despite not being so. Schwarzenbach's vocals evoked Morrissey, while the band were compared to the work of Green Day, Jawbox and Nirvana. Songs from earlier albums, such as "Bivouac" from Bivouac and "Conditional Oakland" from 24 Hour Revenge Therapy hinted at the gloomy direction that the band would explore on "Accident Prone" and "Jet Black". Givony said these two tracks evoked the work of Built to Spill, Spiritualized and Swervedriver instead of the Jawbreaker that made their debut album Unfun (1990) or 24 Hour Revenge Therapy. Dear You returned to the darker tone of Bivouac, though without that album's ambitious songwriting.

Following the release of Bivouac, the band received a letter from a friend that stated, "you can't dance to pain", which Pfahler loved and wanted to name Dear You that instead of its final title. While 24 Hour Revenge Therapy was about a relationship with one person, Dear You dealt with the aftermath of that. In an Alternative Press interview, Schwarzenbach called it the "death album", referring to the issues with his romantic life and the death of his close friends. In a 2022 interview, he said he had went through years of "wrestling with pretty brutal depression [...] I can see my diagnosis is pretty clearly in a lot of those lyrics". Schwarzenbach said the band were aiming to expanded their musical palette, or else they would have broken up. Previously, the energy of performing would be the driving factor of the band's creativity; Schwarzenbach found it difficult screaming constantly as he explained: "I had to live the part of the brute in order to sing about it". He decided to sing more instead of scream, and subsequently wrote material in sing-able keys that would allow him better vocal control.

Tracks
The album's opening track, "Save Your Generation", deals with slacker culture and being a pessimist. In a retrospective review for Gibson, writer Jonah Bayer said it exemplifies the album's sound: "a melodic pop sensibility that’s augmented with buzzing Les Pauls, driving drums, and [...] Schwarzenbach’s signature one-liners". "Fireman" consists of a single-note guitar riff in the style of Nirvana. With it, Schwarzenbach reimagines himself as a tidal wave that impacts the coastline that his ex-girlfriend lives on. He explained that while in his residence in Oakland, he wanted to see how "callous I could get. I allowed myself to think really terrible thoughts, and that's just what came out". Richmond Times-Dispatch writer Ryan Self said the song was a "stark and disarming tale of lost love and revenge that'll make you think twice about those old boyfriends or girlfriends". Michael Nelson of Stereogum wrote that in "Accident Prone", Jawbreaker emulated the "weight of a thousand guitars to hammer home a battering ram of a chorus and a stellar, sweeping bridge", with its big sound "heightening the intensity". "Chemistry" is about Pfahler and Schwarzenbach attending Crossroads School in Santa Monica, California. In the mid-tempo song "Million", Schwarzenbach pines for a relationship that would operate like a recording contract. An earlier version of "Lurker II: Dark Son of Night" had a 45-word title with lyrics that revolved around Boba Fett from Star Wars.

Schwarzenbach said "Jet Black" was the "epitome of pathological white angst"; it opens and closes with a sample of Christopher Walken's character from Annie Hall (1977). Mischa Pearlman of Louder wrote that it comes across as a "nihilistic vision of [Walken's] own apocalypse", which complimented the track's evaluation of "psychological and emotional damage". The clip had been known as the answering message on Pfahler's telephone for a period of time before they decided to include it in the track. To include it, they had to forfeit 25% of the publishing "and it was worth every cent of those eleven dollars". "Bad Scene, Everyone's Fault" features exes doing better at making out with other people than the narrator at parties, while "Sluttering (May 4th)" has two exes of Schwarzenbach connect over his lameness. The mid-tempo track "Basilica" is followed by the acoustic track "Unlisted Track", which concludes the album. Discussing "Shirt", Pfahler said Schwarzenbach wished they had recorded it in another musical key. "Sister" describes an occasion where Schwarzenbach brought his sister along on tour with the band for two shows. Pfahler recalled that during this, they had a fight in the van and after 30 minutes of no talking, "someone turned to his sister and said, 'Well, this is the rock and roll lifestyle. Check it out!. "Friendly Fire", which acts as a musical bridge between Dear You and its predecessor, deals with Schwarzenbach's paranoia around signing to a major label and seeing it as a fight for survival.

Release
Following the making of Dear You, Jawbreaker had six months of downtime until its release; Schwarzenbach complained about the wait, which was driven by Geffen Records' promotional department. Though the band was invited to appear on that year's Lollapalooza, they declined. "Fireman" was released as the lead single from Dear You on August 15, 1995, featuring the album version and an edit of the titular track, with "Lurker II: Dark Son of Night" and a cover of the Psychedelic Furs track "Into You Like a Train" (1981) as its B-sides. The music video for "Fireman" was released at the start of the month; the song was not the band's choice but they agreed to star in the clip. Schwarzenbach said they located a theatre in Oakland, California and painted the room for it. Mark Kohr, who worked on the clips for "Basket Case" and "Longview" (1994) by Green Day, directed the video. Though it showed initial promise at radio, interest in it quickly dissipated, and MTV dropped the video from its rotation after eight airings. After initially being scheduled for August 15, and then pushed back to August 29, Dear You was eventually released on the Geffen imprint DGC Records on September 12, 1995. An image of a horse is included on the front cover, while a picture of the band is included on the back, which Self said made them come across as "rather menacing". The booklet features an image a relative of Pfahler's giving the middle finger.

To promote the release of Dear You, Geffen Records organised a cruise ship for Jawbreaker and 250 individuals consisting of journalists, contest winners and associates. The band went on a tour with Jawbox, dubbed Monsters of Jaw. With Geffen's backing, the band were able to stay in separate hotel rooms while on tour, unlike previous experiences where they would have to sneak people into their rooms. Sometime later, "Lurker II: Dark Son of Night" was released as a promotional single with "Million" as its B-side. In December 1995 and January 1996, they toured Australia as part of the multi-day Summersault festival, marking their biggest shows in their career to individual crowds over 10,000 each, ultimately playing to 50,000 collectively. "Save Your Generation" was released as a promotional single in 1996. By April 1996, "Accident Prone" was being touted as the next single from the album. Nelson said a radio edit version of the track removed the bridge section and "tripled the chorus, rendering one of their best songs repetitive and shitty". When asked about making a video for "Accident Prone", Schwarzenbach said that they "couldn't do that [as the] first [video] because it's too heavy" of a choice. Money that was allotted for it was reimbursed into touring, enabling the band to continue promoting the album.

In April 1996, Jawbreaker went on tour supporting the Foo Fighters; at this stage, the members of Jawbreaker felt fatigued and grew tired of one another. With Dear You and the signing to Geffen, the band had lost a significant portion of their fan base, performing to festival crowds that were apathetic towards them. Leading up to the tour's conclusion, the members agreed to drive throughout the night to get home. Pfahler had Bauermeister drive him to the airport in order to get a flight home, and upon returning, Bauermeister saw Schwarzenbach relaxing with the members of the Foo Fighters. In the time that it took Bauermeister it drop off Pfahler, everyone else decided that they would be staying the night where they were, which he did not agree with. This resulted in Bauermeister and Schwarzenbach engaging in a fist fight; the following day, they discussed breaking up. Sometime later, they held a meeting at Pfahler's residence where they decided on disbanding. They played their last show in support of the album on May 16, 1996 in Olympia, Washington; they formally announced their break up on July 4, 1996. Geffen attempt to get Pfahler and Schwarzenbach to form a new act, though neither person was interested. The label subsequently let the album go out of print.

Related releases, events and reissues
After Jawbreaker's demise, Pfahler became the band's de facto custodian, setting out to reclaim the recordings that had been given out to different labels over the previous years. A recording from an April 1996 show was released on Pfahler's label Blackball Records in 1999 under the title Live 4/30/96, marking the band's first live album. When Geffen and its parent company Universal Music Group (UMG) were later asked about acquiring Dear You, a high-level executive claimed to have never heard of the band. Copies of it were being sold for $60 on online auction website eBay, becoming a cult object in the process. In 1998, Pfahler  began contacting UMG concerning Dear You; after no success, he talked with Cahn. After paying Cahn in free DVDs from the video rental store that he owned, a deal was brokered. The "Into You Like a Train" cover, alongside previously unreleased outtakes "Sister", "Friendly Fire" and "Boxcar", were included on the band's sole compilation album, Etc. (2002).

In late 2002, it was announced that after five years of trying, Pfahler licensed Dear You from UMG for $10,000, after not being able to buy the album's rights, for a period of 10 years. As a stipulation that the album would be under Blackball Records, Pfahler was forced to pay their former label a higher rate on royalties than what the band would have otherwise received. Following a planned date of mid-2003, Dear You was eventually reissued on CD through Blackball in March 2004 with the "Fireman" video. It included the "Fireman" video, alongside "Into You Like a Train", "Sister", "Friendly Fire", "Boxcar" – all taken from Etc. – and "Shirt". Pfahler explained that his participation in this edition amounted to the song selection and design, as the staff at Revolver Distribution and PR company Hopper did the rest of the work. True Love Records had planned to release the demo version of "I Love You So Much It's Killing Us Both" as a single;  this version was eventually released on the various artists compilation For Callum (2007). Blackball Records pressed Dear You a two-LP set in 2004, which was re-pressed in 2008. Subsequent editions by DGC, Geffen and UMe have been single-disc editions, such as the 2015 and 2020 pressings.

In 2022, Jawbreaker embarked on a delayed 25th anniversary tour for the album. The initial announcement consisted of 10 shows before it was expanded considerably, taking place over the course of three months. They were supported by Jawbox, Team Dresch, Descendents and Face to Face, among others, on various dates of the trek. The Lemonheads played a few of the shows before being replaced by the Get Up Kids; Lemonheads frontman Evan Dando said they were thrown off for "violating a rule that wasn’t posted anywhere. We got kicked off the tour for going into the audience before the show".

Reception

Critics generally praised the album's sound. AllMusic review Tim Sendra wrote that it was a "sleek, slick punk-grunge classic that relies as much on clever songwriting and restrained emotions as it does on the group's trademarked high-energy attack". Bayer said that while modern-day releases can be "faulted for not being diverse enough, ironically Dear You follows a distinctive formula that makes it nearly perfect from start to finish". CMJ New Music Monthly writer Allison Stewart referred to it as the band's "finest and most assured record yet, even if comparisons to Green Day are unavoidable". While they are not "as colorful as Green Day", she added that Jawbreaker was thankfully lacking that act's "annoying mall-punk schtick". Reviewing the 2004 reissue, Kyle Ryan of Punk Planet said the album's "big guitars, subdued bass and unraspy vocals" make it standout from the band's past releases, and while others have since replicated its sound, it has successfully remained "timely nearly a decade after its release". Impact Press editor Craig Mazer noted that "some tracks are more punchy/punky than others, but every song leaves its mark". PopMatters Jon Goff was indifferent to the music, as "what was once widely considered watered-down punk now sounds more like harmless alternative radio", and Tom Sinclair of Entertainment Weekly said it "isn’t quite as stellar" as earlier albums, though it manags to surpass the majority of their contemporaries. Nathan Mauger of The Spokesman-Review disliked the sound, stating that the band seem "Studioized. The new sound is gauzy and soft; it’s Jawbreaker, cough-syrup style", and negatively compared Schwartzenbauch's guitar tone to Green Day's, making the tracks "suffer considerably". Greg Beets of The Austin Chronicle went on fruther, saying that Cavallo's "flat production castrates the band" and the "sad result is one of obfuscated talent in the name of radio friendliness", which Pitchfork writer Christopher Sebela agreed with. Self, meanwhile, said the "recording clarity allow this band to sound more poignant and focused than ever".

Reviewers were appreciative of the album's lyrics and Schwartzenbauch's vocals. Mazer called it a "poetic masterpiece, with Blake crafting emotional songs, allowing the music's energy to feed off the intensity of the lyrics", while Mauger wrote that the majority of the "decipherable songs have a point to make, and do it effectively". Brian Howe of The Fanzine viewed it as a "vibrant, realized mature album" that showcases "rather ingenious wordplay", while Sinclair said the "literate lyrics" made them the "thinking person's Green Day". Goff thought that it quickly descends into "territory that has drawn a lot of fire over the years: lovelorn self-deprecation", and Sebela thought the words "strain[ed] for depth in pursuit of the album's overall sad-sack mood". Punknews.org staff member Johnathon1069 said the lyrical style change was "too dramatic" for him, comparing it to a person at a party "looking out at the scene through somewhat jaded eyes". Beets, meanwhile, said that while some of the "privileged, post-grad prose drips with excess quirk and irony, it rises far and away above the 'intellectual intercourse' passed off as deep by whiners" such as Alanis Morissette. Julie Gerstein of Punk Planet noted that it was "filled with Schwartzenbauch's raspy, sad vocals and charged, emotional (but not emo) lyrics, Dear You encapsulates the hurt and cynicism of a break-up like nothing else". Mauger said the band's previous strength was Schwartzenbauch’s "ragged I-just-swallowed-glass voice", but on here, it sounds like it was given the same treatment" as his guitar tone. Joe Gross of Spin wrote that when the album was released, Schwarzenbach's "smoothed-out vocals" came across as a "naked bid for KROQ airplay. Today, it just sounds like he's trying to trade the basement for the big tent without embarrassing himself".

Upon release, Dear You peaked at number 22 on the Billboard Heatseekers Albums chart. By 2002, it had sold 40,000 copies in the US. Fellow artist Cali Dewitt, who worked at Geffen, said everyone at the label was enthusiastic about the album. However, when it did not become a commercial success, it "took like less than a week until everyone in the company never uttered their name again". The album was being sold for $16.99; Pfahler recounted in a 2002 interview: "I'm not saying that [price] fucked up our sales, but it certainly didn't help". Soundthesirens founder Billy Ho highlighted four other punk releases from the era that similarly had little success like Dear You: Nothing Sacred (1996) by Hog, Feel Lucky Punk by Klover, Clumsy (1994) by Samiam and Waterdog (1995) by Waterdog. Ho attributed the lack of success for Dear You to it being tonally removed from their past releases.

Aftermath and legacy
At the time of Dear You release, much of the band's pre-existing fanbase did not receive the album well, criticizing its production style. As Jawbreaker had made many previous comments to the media declaring their disdain of the major-label music industry–claiming many times that they would not sign to a major label–many fans saw the band signing to DGC Records as a "betrayal" and branded them hypocrites. Some of the band's detractors erroneously blamed Schwarzenbach's surgery as being the core issue, pointing out the change in vocal style in the year between 24 Hour Revenge Therapy and Dear You. Givony explained that fans had no reliable account of the events at the time, only hearsay to go off of, and were unaware that the surgery had actually happened before the release of Bivouac. He said this made 24 Hour Revenge Therapy the post-surgery album instead of Dear You, "which was precisely the opposite of how most fans understood it then and now". Pfahler said the story of them leaving an independent label for a major "eclipsed the content of the record" itself as that was "all everyone was talking about". It became the main narrative that the press clung on to, that they "betrayed all of our people by chasing a buck". The staff at Billboard said the band "seemed destined to become nothing more than a footnote in the ’90s punk revival". After Jawbreaker's breakup, many of the fans changed their opinion to a more positive view. While touring with his next band Jets to Brazil, people would approach Schwarzenbach and tell them of their admiration for Dear You.

The Billboard staff wrote that the punk scene grew in the years following; unlike Green Day and the Offspring, MTV had not yet embraced the emo music that Jawbreaker was performing. In the 2000s, emo became a popular venture, with labels like Vagrant Records selling out venues with tour packages in that style. Dear You subsequently has become an influence on the next wave of emo and pop-punk music;  Jimmy Eat World in particular, who would have a top 10 single with "The Middle" (2001). Gross said some of the lyrics on Dear You foreshadowed the "youthful nookie anxiety of your average Drive-Thru band", while others were "beating Chris Carrabba [of Dashboard Confessional] to the passive-aggressive punch by five years". Dan Bogosian of Consequence considered "Save Your Generation" and "Bad Scene, Everyone’s Fault" as influences on the punk aspects of the 2010s emo revival. Chris Conley of Saves the Day, who called Dear You one of his favorite albums, compared the reaction to his vocal change on In Reverie (2003) to what Schwarzenbach went through. Author Dan Ozzi documented the making of Dear You in his book Sellout: The Major Label Feeding Frenzy That Swept Punk, Emo, and Hardcore (1994-2007) (2021), after having previously discussed it in a piece about other major label debut albums some years prior. Ryan Ritchie of OC Weekly said the title of "Sluttering (May 4th)" gave birth to Jawbreaker Day: the band has a "devoted fanbase and the Internet is prime real estate for nerds doing nerdy things. Put the two together and May 4 becomes Jawbreaker Day". Pfahler said he had become aware of the celebration through the message board on Blackball Records' website.

Tributes and accolades
Several of the songs have been covered for different tribute albums over the years: three for So Much for Letting Go: A Tribute to Jawbreaker Vol. 1 (2003); seven for Bad Scene, Everyone's Fault: Jawbreaker Tribute (2003); and ten for What's the Score? (2015). Gordon Withers covered "Fireman" and "Accident Prone" for his album Jawbreaker on Cello (2019), which came about from his involvement in the Jawbreaker documentary Don't Break Down (2017). Standalone covers of "Accident Prone" by Glacier Veins and "Unlisted Track" by the Story So Far have also been released. In 2022, the labels Lavasocks and Sell the Heart Records collaborated on a tribute album of Dear You, titled Lawbreaker – Dear Who?. Intended to coincide with that album's 25th anniversary, it features covers from the likes of Jonah Matranga and Middle-Aged Queers. Saves the Day and Thrice had cited songs from Dear You as influencing one of their albums; while My Chemical Romance would specifically work with Cavallo on The Black Parade (2006) after learning of his involvement on Dear You, which had influenced their previous album Three Cheers for Sweet Revenge (2004).

Dear You has appeared on various best-of emo album lists by Alternative Press, Kerrang!, LA Weekly, NME, and Rolling Stone, as well as by journalists Leslie Simon and Trevor Kelley in their book Everybody Hurts: An Essential Guide to Emo Culture (2007). Similarly, "Accident Prone" appeared on a best-of emo songs list by Vulture. Stereogum named "Jet Black" in their list of "30 Emo Songs: Late 90s & Early 2000s Essentials", stating that its "introspective and nuanced songwriting" would act as a forerunner for Schwarzenbach's subsequent work with Jets to Brazil. Several tracks from the album have similarly appeared on best-of lists for Jawbreaker songs by Alternative Press, God Is in the TV, Louder and Stereogum.

Track listing

Charts

See also
 Orange Rhyming Dictionary – the 1998 debut album by Jets to Brazil, Schwarzenbach's next project after Dear You
 Pinkerton – the 1996 album by Weezer, also released by DGC, which similarly did not see acclaim until years after its release
 Clarity – the 1999 album by Jimmy Eat World that saw them being dropped by a major label

References
Citations

Sources

Further reading

External links

Dear You at YouTube (streamed copy where licensed)
 Jawbreaker homepage hosted by Geffen Records

Jawbreaker (band) albums
1995 albums
Albums produced by Rob Cavallo
Grunge albums